There are numerous types of research methods used when conducting neurological research, all with the purpose of trying to view the activity that occurs within the brain during a certain activity or behavior. The disciplines within which these methods are used is quite broad, ranging from psychology to neuroscience to biomedical engineering to sociology. The following is a list of neuroimaging methods:

Electroencephalography (EEG)
Quantitative electroencephalography (QEEG)
Stereoelectroencephalography (SEEG)
Functional magnetic resonance imaging (fMRI)
Magnetoencephalography (MEG)
Near-infrared spectroscopy (NIRS)
Positron emission tomography (PET)
Single-unit recording
Transcranial direct-current stimulation (TDCS)
Transcranial magnetic stimulation (TMS)

See also 
neuroimaging
functional neuroimaging

Neurological research methods
Research methods
Cognitive science lists